Fremont Cole (September 18, 1856 Covert, Seneca County, New York – November 15, 1915 Little Neck, Queens, New York City) was an American lawyer and politician.

Life
He was the son of Ira H. Cole, a farmer. In 1876, he moved to Watkins in Schuyler County. Here he studied law in the office of O. P. Hurd, then Surrogate of Schuyler County. He was admitted to the bar, and became Clerk of the Surrogate Court. Five years later he opened his own law firm with his brother Irving N. Cole, which he dissolved in 1890 when he moved to Washington.

He was a member of the New York State Assembly (Schuyler Co.) in 1885, 1886, 1887, 1888 and 1889; and was Speaker in 1888 and 1889. In October 1889, he was defeated by Charles T. Saxton in his quest for the Republican nomination to run for the New York State Senate in the 29th District.

In October 1888, he married Charlotte Roberts (1863–1943).

He was buried at Glenwood Cemetery in Watkins (now Watkins Glen), N.Y.

Sources
 The struggle for the speakership, in NYT on January 2, 1888
The Political Graveyard: Index to Politicians: Cole at politicalgraveyard.com Political Graveyard
 His plan to move to Washington State, in NYT on September 12, 1890
 His defeat at the Rep. senatorial convention, in NYT on October 9, 1889
 His nomination in the Rep. assemblymen's caucus, with short bio, in NYT on January 3, 1888
Glenwood Cem., Schuyler co., NY - p1 at www.rootsweb.com Burials at Glenwood Cemetery, at Rootsweb
 Obit notice in NYT on November 16, 1915

1856 births
1915 deaths
Speakers of the New York State Assembly
Republican Party members of the New York State Assembly
People from Covert, New York
People from Watkins Glen, New York
19th-century American politicians